The Labour Party was a political party in the Solomon Islands.

History
The party was established by Honiara MP Peter Salaka in 1970. It gained support from the Honiara Labour Union.

The party was dissolved in 1971 when Salaka left the party to take the chairmanship of a parliamentary committee.

References

Defunct political parties in the Solomon Islands
1970 establishments in the Solomon Islands
Political parties established in 1970
1971 disestablishments in the Solomon Islands
Political parties disestablished in 1971
Labour parties